Stenoptilia luteocinereus is a moth of the family Pterophoridae. It is found in the Amur region of Russia.

References

Moths described in 1884
luteocinereus
Moths of Asia